Ross in the U.S. state of Wisconsin may refer to:

 Ross, Wisconsin, a town
 Ross, Vernon County, Wisconsin, an unincorporated community
 Ross Crossing, Wisconsin, an unincorporated community